Antoinette is a given name, that is a diminutive feminine form of Antoine and Antonia (from Latin Antonius).

People with the name include:

Nobles 

 Antoinette de Maignelais, Baroness of Villequier by marriage (1434–1474), mistress of Charles VII of France and later of Francis II, Duke of Brittany
 Antoinette de Bourbon (1493–1583)
 Princess Antoinette of Brunswick-Wolfenbüttel (1696–1762)
 Princess Antoinette of Saxe-Coburg-Saalfeld (1779–1824)
 Antoinette de Mérode (1828–1864), Princess of Monaco
 Princess Antoinette of Saxe-Altenburg (1838–1908)
 Princess Antoinette, Baroness of Massy (1920–2011)

Artists and entertainers
 Antoinette de Beaucaire (1840–1865), Occitan language poet
 Antoinette Beumer (born 1962), Dutch film director
 Antoinette Bower (born 1932), German-born British actress
 Antoinette Cellier (1913–1981), English actress
 Antoinette du Ligier de la Garde Deshoulières (1638–1694), French poet
 Antoinette Halloran, Australian operatic soprano
 Antoinette Hertsenberg (born 1964), Dutch television presenter
 Antoinette Kirkwood (born 1930), English composer
 Antoinette Miggiani (born 1937), Maltese soprano
 Antoinette Lovell Patterson (born 1970), American rapper Antoinette (rapper)
 Antoinette Perry (1888–1946), American actress and director for whom the Tony Awards are named
 Antoinette Sibley (born 1939), British ballerina
 Antoinette Sterling (1850–1904), Anglo-American vocalist
 Antoinette Taus (born 1980), Filipino-American actress
 Antoinette-Thérèse Des Houlières (1659–1718), French poet

Athletes
 Antoinette Guedia Mouafo (born 1995), Cameroonian swimmer
 Antoinette de Jong (born 1995), Dutch speed skater
 Antoinette Lucas (born 1968), American field hockey player
 Antoinette Meyer (1920–2010), Swiss alpine skier
 Antoinette Nana Djimou (born 1985), Cameroonian-French heptathlete and pentathlete
 Antoinette Uys (born 1976), South African badminton player

Politicians
 Antoinette Batumubwira (born 1956), Burundian politician
 Antoinette Montaigne, French/Central African politician and lawyer
 Antoinette Sandbach (born 1969), Welsh politician
 Antoinette Spaak (born 1928), Belgian politician

Others
 Antoinette Bourignon (1616–1680), French-Flemish mystic and adventurer
 Antoinette Bouzonnet-Stella (–1676), French engraver
 Antoinette Brown Blackwell (1825–1921), first woman to be ordained as a mainstream Protestant minister in the United States
 Antoinette Downing (1904–2001), American architect
 Antoinette Feuerwerker (1912–2003), French Resistance member and jurist
 Antoinette Fouque (1936–2014), French psychoanalyst
 Antoinette Frank (born 1971), American convicted murderer
 Antoinette Konikow (1869–1946), American physician, feminist, and radical political activist
 Antoinette Nording (1814–1887), Swedish perfume entrepreneur 
 Antoinette Pirie (1905–1991), British biochemist, ophthalmologist, and educator
 Antoinette Van Leer Polk (1847–1919), American plantation owner
 Antoinette Sayeh (born 1958), Liberian economist
 Antoinette Schoar, American economist

See also
 Other feminine given names formed from "Antonius":
Antionette
 Antonella
Antonette
 Antonia (disambiguation)
 Antonietta (disambiguation)
 Marie Antoinette (disambiguation)

References

French feminine given names